Veliki Crljeni is a village in the Lazarevac municipality of Belgrade, the capital of Serbia. The population of the settlement is 4,318 people (2011 census).

There is a thermal power plant Kolubara A, with large coal field, which provides most of the employment for its citizens.

References

Suburbs of Belgrade
Šumadija
Lazarevac